Donald McLean (born 20 September 1955) is a Caymanian sailor. He competed in the Star event at the 1996 Summer Olympics. He became the president of the Cayman Islands Olympic Committee in 2005.

References

External links
 

1955 births
Living people
Caymanian male sailors (sport)
Olympic sailors of the Cayman Islands
Sailors at the 1996 Summer Olympics – Star
Place of birth missing (living people)